The Pass is a 1988 Soviet animated short film, directed by Vladimir Tarasov and written by Kir Bulychov. It is adapted from the first chapter titled The Pass from Bulychyov's novel The Settlement (printed in English as Those Who Survive).

Plot

On a distant, snow-covered planet, a starship from Earth crashes. Due to dangerous radiation levels, the survivors have to evacuate far away. Over years, the radiation levels go down but all attempting to return to the ship die when crossing a treacherous mountain pass, due to a combination of the elements and wild animals who come out at night.

Finally, when only a few survivors are left, their teenaged children - all who were born on the world - and one of the adults decide to try to reach the ship one last time, to gain needed supplies and set off a beacon that would summon a rescue mission.

References

External links

 
ПЕРЕВАЛ / THE PASS, cartoon, USSR, 1988, (with ENGLISH subtitles) on YouTube
 
 
 
 
 

1988 films
Films based on works by Kir Bulychov
Russian and Soviet animated science fiction films
Films by Vladimir Tarasov
Soyuzmultfilm
Russian animated short films